Karkhaneh-ye Hakim (also Romanized as  Kārkhāneh-ye Ḩakīm and Kārkhāneh-ye Ḩakīmī; also known as Kārkhāneh Folāndasht (Persian: كارخانه فلاندشت), also Romanized as Kārkhāneh-ye Folān Dasht and Kārkhāneh-ye Fūn Dasht; also known as Kārkhāneh, Kārkuneh, and Karkhāneh Sālār) is a village in Hemmatabad Rural District, in the Central District of Borujerd County, Lorestan Province, Iran. At the 2006 census, its population was 166, in 34 families.

References 

Towns and villages in Borujerd County